The Bombycidae are a family of moths. The best-known species is Bombyx mori (Linnaeus), or silkworm, native to northern China and domesticated for millennia. Another well-known species is Bombyx mandarina, also native to Asia.

Taxonomy
The family was recently severely restricted, and currently contains only one or two subfamilies, the Bombycinae and Epiinae (previously the tribe Epiini). The former subfamilies Oberthueriinae and Prismostictinae have been placed as subjective junior synonyms of Endromidae. The former subfamilies Apatelodinae and Phiditiinae have been reinstated as separate families.

Genera
This list is provisional. Ephoria may be a synonym of Epholca (Geometridae: Ennominae: Ourapterygini), and Epia may be one of Hadena (Noctuidae: Hadeninae: Hadenini), and may also be placed within Apatelodidae, along with Tamphana. Some genera were formerly placed in Apatelodinae, such as Anticla and Quentalia.

Amusaron
Anticla Walker, 1855
Bivincula
Bivinculata
Bombyx
Colla
Dalailama
Elachyophtalma
Epia
Ernolatia
Gastridiota
Gnathocinara
Gunda
Moeschleria
Ocinara
Penicillifera
Quentalia Schaus, 1929
Racinoa
Rondotia
Tamphana
Trilocha
Triuncina
Valvaribifidum
Vinculinula
Vingerhoedtia

References

Natural History Museum Lepidoptera genus database
 List of Bombycidae Types (Museum Witt München).

 
Moth families